The 2007–08 Netball Superleague season (known for sponsorship reasons as the Co-operative Netball Superleague) was the third season of the Netball Superleague. The league was won by Galleria Mavericks after they defeated Loughborough Lightning in the grand final. This was Mavericks first title win.

Overview
The season started in October 2007 and was concluded in April 2008 with the grand final. Sky Sports continued to broadcast matches and The Co-operative Group became the Netball Superleague's new sponsor. Loughborough Lightning finished top of the table with the conclusion of the regular season but it was Galleria Mavericks who finished as champions after they defeated Lightning in the grand final.

Teams

Regular season
After winning 13 of their 14 matches, Loughborough Lightning finished top of the table with the conclusion of the regular season. The only team to beat Lightning during the regular season was Team Northumbria. With a team that included Megan Hutton, they enjoyed their best season in the Netball Superleague, finishing second during the regular season and qualifying for the play-offs.

Final table

Play-offs
The play-offs utilised the Page–McIntyre system to determine the two grand finalists. This saw the top two from the regular season, Loughborough Lightning and Team Northumbria, play each other, with the winner going straight through to the grand final. The loser get a second chance to reach the grand final via the minor final. The third and fourth placed teams, Team Bath and Galleria Mavericks also play each other, and the winner advances to the minor final. The winner of the minor final qualifies for the grand final.

Major semi-final

Minor semi-final

Minor final

Grand Final

References

 
2007-08
 
 
2007 in Welsh women's sport
2008 in Welsh women's sport